AWF may refer to:
 African Wildlife Foundation, a conservation NGO
 Africa Wrestling Federation, the former name of the Africa Wrestling Alliance
 Alabama Wildlife Federation, a nonprofit organization 
 Amazingly Workable Formatter, a text formatting program (see nroff)
 American Wrestling Federation, a defunct professional wrestling promotion based in Chicago
 Australasian Wrestling Federation
 Australian Wrestling Federation, an Australian professional wrestling promotion
 Apocalypse Wrestling Federation, a Canadian professional wrestling promotion based in Toronto
 AWF, Microsoft at Work Fax file format